Channel i was a Singaporean English language free-to-air terrestrial television channel that was launched on 20 May 2001 as TVWorks. The channel was owned by SPH MediaWorks, a subsidiary of Singapore Press Holdings.

As a result of the media merger with Mediacorp, it shut down due to low ratings and lack of advertiser support. All Channel i shows officially shift and moved to officially replaced by Channel 5. Its frequencies (terrestrial and cable) and channel space were taken over by Okto (using Central's old format) nearly four years later. Okto itself later also closed down on 1 May 2019 due to similar reasons, after which the channel space created by TVWorks in 2001, folded and ceased to exist.

History 

On 26 April 2001, SPH MediaWorks received a nationwide free-to-air television service licence from the Singapore Broadcasting Authority, allowing them to start broadcasting two channels, Channel U, a Chinese language channel, and TVWorks, an English channel. On 20 May 2001, TVWorks was launched. On 9 November 2001, TVWorks was restructured following a loss of 65 employees and a decreasing audience share. Plans for its shutdown were dismissed. On 25 February 2002, it was announced that the channel would rebrand as Channel i. This rebrand became effective on 3 March 2002. Under the new name, Channel i would put a strong emphasis on action entertainment and coverage of the S.League, as well as offering movies every evening. The new brand reflected "the habits, preferences and tastes of the viewers"

i Sports like sport event programmes including tennis Grand Slam (including Australian Open and Wimbledon Championships) and soccer 2002 FIFA World Cup, i Movies like Hollywood films was Hollywood major big film studios (Universal Pictures, and Paramount Pictures) includes Casper, Notting Hill, The Green Mile, and The Scorpion King, and i Drama like United States television series was Hollywood major big television productions (Universal Television, and Paramount Television).

Final Broadcast 
On 7 December 2004, it was announced that Channel i will leave the air permanently as part of the merge of Mediacorp and SPH Mediaworks.

At 1:30am SST, 1 January (New Year's Day) 2005, Channel i officially ceased broadcasting and transmission with the very final and last programme usually very final and last repeat programme of the very final and last edition of the Channel i News (featuring footage from its local current affairs programming) and a message of thanks from the SPH MediaWorks team. The ident in use then played, then a video montage as part of the final shutdown sequence rolled showing footage of imported content, sporting events and local programming, set to Shirley Bassey's Thank You for the Years. This modulated to a farewell montage with similar clips interspersed with countdown digits, set to Andrea Bocelli, Sarah Brightman - Time to Say Goodbye. As the final lyric of the song ricocheted on the air, the real countdown in accelerated format before the channel ident was played for one last time, and concluding with "Farewell Singapore". A brief shot of static was followed by the national anthem music video being played and screen fades to black as going off-the-air to ceased broadcast and ceased transmission to television transmitter officially shut down so switch off was ceased broadcasts the end. All Channel i shows officially shift and moved to officially replaced by Channel 5.

Former programmes

as TVWorks 
 The Big Buffet – biweekly run
 Big Chilli Wednesday
 The Odd Squad
 Jalan Jalan
 The Big Break
 The Mensroom
 Here's A Million – Gameshow
 After Hours – Talk show
 It's All In The Body – Info-Ed
 Dollars & Sense – Current Affairs

as Channel i 
 Ah Girl (3 seasons) – Sitcom
 Channel i News – News
 Cue – Current affairs
 Eyewitness – Current affairs
 Durian King – Drama
 Fat to Fit – Reality
 Heath Matters – Current affairs
 iContact – Current affairs
 i On The News – Current affairs
 i2u – Variety
 Makansutra (4 seasons) – Infotainment
 Perceptions – Drama
 Singapore Shakes – Drama
 Six Weeks – Drama
 On Today – Current affairs
 The Money Tree – Current affairs
 World Life – Current affairs

See also 
 Channel U (Singaporean TV channel)
 Channel 5 (Singaporean TV channel)
 Okto
 Central (TV channel)
 CNA (TV network)
 SPH MediaWorks

References

SPH MediaWorks
2001 establishments in Singapore
2005 disestablishments in Singapore
Broadcasting in Singapore
Television channels and stations established in 2001
Television channels and stations disestablished in 2005
Television stations in Singapore